Cleo Montgomery (born July 1, 1956 in Greenville, Mississippi) is a former American football wide receiver and return specialist. He played for six seasons in the National Football League (NFL) for the Los Angeles Raiders, Cleveland Browns, and Cincinnati Bengals.

Related

1956 births
American football wide receivers
Abilene Christian Wildcats football players
Los Angeles Raiders players
Oakland Raiders players
Cleveland Browns players
Cincinnati Bengals players
Living people
Sportspeople from Greenville, Mississippi
Players of American football from Mississippi